What More Can I Say? is the debut studio album by American hip hop duo Audio Two. It was released in 1988 through First Priority Records with distribution by Atlantic Records. Recording sessions took place at I.N.S. Studios, Such-A-Sound Studio and First Priority Lab in New York City. Production was handled by its members Milk Dee and DJ Gizmo with Daddy-O and the King of Chill. The album found only mild success, making it to #185 on the Billboard 200 and #45 on the Top R&B/Hip-Hop Albums chart in the United States. What More Can I Say? spawned four singles: "Make It Funky"/"Top Billin'", "Hickeys Around My Neck", "Many Styles"/"The Questions" and "I Don't Care". The song "I Like Cherries" was previously released on Flip-Flop Mini-Album, a 1986 split mini-LP dropped with the Alliance (King of Chill, Kool C and D.J. Dice).

Track listing

Personnel
Nathaniel V. "DJ Gizmo" Robinson Jr. – main artist, producer, executive producer
Kirk S. "Milk Dee" Robinson – main artist, producer, engineering
Glenn K. "Daddy-O" Bolton – featured artist & producer (tracks: 1, 7, 10)
Freddie "The King Of Chill" Byrd – featured artist & producer (track 11)
Shlomo Sonnenfeld – engineering
Phil DeMartino – engineering
Gary Clugston – engineering
Dan Sheehan – engineering
Yoram Vazan – engineering
Bob Defrin – art direction
Shirt King – artwork
Carol Bobolts – design
John Pinderhughes – photography

Chart history

References

External links
 

1988 debut albums
Audio Two albums
Atlantic Records albums